Sunder Katwala is a British political activist of Indian and Irish heritage. He is the director of British Future, a UK-based think tank, and former general secretary of the Fabian Society. 

British Future, which also addresses issues of migration and opportunity, launched in January 2012. The think-tank's call for the adoption of an English national anthem, backed by MPs from different UK political parties, won the support of Prime Minister David Cameron, according to reports on the website ConservativeHome and in The Sunday Telegraph. It also campaigned unsuccessfully for a special Sunday on Remembrance Sunday 2014.

He was previously with The Observer newspaper, as a leader writer and internet editor, and was Research Director of The Foreign Policy Centre think-tank from 1999 to 2001. He became Fabian general secretary in October 2003, and held the position until July 2011.

Katwala also writes for The Guardian newspaper, for the New Statesman, the Spectator Coffee House blog, and for Liberal Conspiracy blog.

In 2010 the Daily Telegraph included Katwala at number 32 in its list of the '100 most influential left-wingers' in British politics, while he was Fabian General Secretary. British Future claims to be a non-partisan group which engages across the political spectrum, and to have staff and Trustees with backgrounds across the major political parties.

References 

Living people
British activists
British columnists
The Observer people
British bloggers
Year of birth missing (living people)
Place of birth missing (living people)
General Secretaries of the Fabian Society
British politicians of Indian descent